Sean Mahoney (born August 12, 1988) is an American former breaststroke swimmer.

A native of Rio Vista, California, Mahoney was a collegiate swimmer for West Virginia University and UC Berkeley.

In 2009, Mahoney competed in the Duel in the Pool and came third in the 200 m breaststroke. He placed fifth in the 200 m breaststroke at that year's World University Games, having earlier broken the games record in the semi-finals.

Mahoney was given a six-month suspension in 2010 after testing positive for the stimulant methylhexaneamine. 

At the 2011 Pan American Games in Guadalajara, Mahoney won a gold medal for the United States in the 200 m breaststroke, setting a games record in the process. The previous record was set by Kyle Salyards in 2003.

Mahoney won four 200 m breaststroke meets in the 2012 FINA Swimming World Cup.

References

External links

1988 births
Living people
American male breaststroke swimmers
People from Solano County, California
Swimmers from California
California Golden Bears men's swimmers
American sportspeople in doping cases
Doping cases in swimming
Pan American Games gold medalists for the United States
Pan American Games medalists in swimming
Medalists at the 2011 Pan American Games
Swimmers at the 2011 Pan American Games
Competitors at the 2009 Summer Universiade